Boromata is a village in the Vakaga Prefecture in the northern Central African Republic.

History 
On 15 March 2008, 13 Chadian Soldiers under the command of the former chief of defense of the UFDR attacked joint UFDR-FACA forces and burned four homes in Boromata. During the attack, the joint forces managed to kill five attackers and capture four. The four prisoners were transferred to Bangui. As a result, 500 people fled to the bush.

Central African Republic Civil War (2013-present) 

On 1 December 2020, the Misseriya Arabs militia from Central Darfur, Sudan, attacked Boromata due to tensions between Misseriya and Goula. The attack caused five deaths and 14 injuries. Other than that, the militia razed 1325 homes and 84 shops.

Famous People
Damane Zakaria, former leader of RPRC

References

Populated places in Vakaga